Frozen Fire (born 2005) is a thoroughbred horse sired by Montjeu from the dam Flamingo Sea, who won the 2008 Irish Derby.

References
 pedigreequery.com - Frozen Fire's pedigree
 racingpost.co.uk - Frozen Fire's race record

2005 racehorse births
Thoroughbred family 8-c
Racehorses trained in Ireland
Racehorses bred in Germany
Irish Classic Race winners